Wallmoden is a village and a former municipality in the district of Goslar in Lower Saxony, Germany. Since 1 November 2021, it is part of the town Langelsheim, of which it is an Ortschaft. It was the ancestral seat of the House of Wallmoden.

Population
As of 30 June 2020 there were 907 inhabitants in Wallmoden.

References

Goslar (district)